James Bates (10 January 1856 – 7 December 1915) was an English cricketer. He played one first-class match for Middlesex in 1880.

See also
 List of Middlesex County Cricket Club players

References

External links
 

1856 births
1915 deaths
English cricketers
Middlesex cricketers
People from Paddington
Cricketers from Greater London